A payer is a person who makes a payment.

Payer also may refer to:

People
Evariste Payer (1887–1963), Canadian professional hockey player
Chantal Payer (born 1953), Canadian fencer
Helge Payer (born 1979), Austrian international footballer
Imre Payer (1888 – 1957), Hungarian footballer.
Serge Payer (born 1979), Canadian ice hockey player

Places
Payer Island, Franz Josef Land, Russia
Payer Mountains, Queen Maud Land, Antarctica
Payer Peak, a mountain in King Christian X Land, Greenland
Mount Payer, Yamalo-Nenets Autonomous Okrug, Russia

See also
Friedrich von Payer (1847–1931), vice-chancellor of Germany during the last year of World War I
Julius von Payer (1841–1915), best known for the North Pole expedition in 1872–74 and the discovery of Franz Josef Land
Player (disambiguation)
Single payer, a type of universal healthcare